Samuel Latham Mitchill (August 20, 1764September 7, 1831) was an American physician, naturalist, and politician who lived in Plandome, New York.

Early life
Samuel Mitchill was born in Hempstead in the Province of New York, the son of Robert Mitchill and his wife, Mary Latham, both Quakers.

He was sent to Scotland and graduated in 1786 from the University of Edinburgh Medical School with an M.D., his education being paid for by a wealthy uncle. Returning to the United States after medical school, Mitchill also completed law school. As a lawyer, he oversaw the purchase of lands in western New York from the Iroquois Indians in 1788.

Career
Mitchill taught chemistry, botany, and natural history at Columbia College from 1792 to 1801 and was a founding editor of The Medical Repository, the first medical journal in the United States. In 1793, he was elected a Foreign Fellow of the Royal Society of Edinburgh. His proposers were James Gregory, Dugald Stewart, and John Rotherham.

In addition to his Columbia lectures on botany, zoology, and mineralogy, Mitchill collected, identified, and classified many plants and animals, particularly aquatic organisms. He was elected a Fellow of the American Academy of Arts and Sciences in 1797. From 1807 to 1826, he taught at the College of Physicians and Surgeons of New York and then helped organize the short-lived Rutgers Medical College of New Jersey, which he served as vice president until 1830. While at Columbia, Mitchill developed a fallacious theory of disease; however, it resulted in his promotion of personal hygiene and improved sanitation.

Mitchill served in the New York State Assembly in 1791 and again in 1798 and was then elected as a Democratic-Republican to the United States House of Representatives, serving from 1801 until his resignation on November 22, 1804. In November 1804, Mitchill was elected a U.S. Senator from New York to fill the vacancy caused by the resignation of John Armstrong, and served from November 23, 1804, to March 4, 1809. He then served again in the House of Representatives from December 4, 1810, to March 4, 1813.  Mitchill was elected a member of the American Antiquarian Society in 1814. On January 29, 1817, Mitchill convened the first meeting of the New York Academy of Sciences, originally called the Lyceum of Natural History, of which he was later elected president.

Mitchill strongly endorsed the building of the Erie Canal, sponsored by his friend and political ally DeWitt Clinton; they were both members of the short-lived New-York Institution. Mitchill suggested renaming the United States of America Fredonia, combining the English "freedom" with a Latinate ending. Although the suggestion was not seriously considered, some towns adopted the name, including Fredonia, New York. Some freebooters established a short-lived republic under that name in Texas in the late 1820s.

Personality
Mitchill was a man of "irrepressible energies... polyglot enthusiasms... [and] distinguished eccentricities" who was not "a man afraid to speak out loud about the loves of plants and animals; indeed, he was not a man afraid to speak out loud on most any topic. In the early nineteenth century, Mitchill was New York's "most publicly universal gentleman... a man known variously as the 'living encyclopedia,' as a 'stalking library,' and (to his admired Jefferson) as the 'Congressional Dictionary.'" "Once described as a 'chaos of knowledge,' Mitchill was generally more admired for his encyclopedic breadth of understanding than for much originality of thought." As a personality, he was affable but also egotistical and pedantic. Mitchill enjoyed popularizing scientific knowledge and promoting practical applications of scientific inquiry.

Published works 

 Mitchill, S. L. 1818. Description of three species of fish. Journal of the Academy of Natural Sciences of Philadelphia 1, 407–412. (BHL link)

Taxon described by him
See :Category:Taxa named by Samuel L. Mitchill

Taxon named in his honor 
The Bay Anchovy, Anchoa mitchilli Valenciennes, 1848 was named after him.

References

External links
 
 
 Francis, John W. Reminiscences of Samuel Latham Mitchell, (1859). From the Digital Collections of the National Library of Medicine.
 Finding aid for the Samuel Latham Mitchill papers at the Museum of the City of New York
Samuel Latham Mitchill Papers at the William L. Clements Library

American naturalists
United States senators from New York (state)
1764 births
People from Hempstead (village), New York
1831 deaths
Politicians from Nassau County, New York
Columbia University faculty
Alumni of the University of Edinburgh
Democratic-Republican Party United States senators
Fellows of the American Academy of Arts and Sciences
Members of the American Antiquarian Society
Fellows of the Royal Society of Edinburgh
Burials at Green-Wood Cemetery
Economists from New York (state)
19th-century American physicians
Democratic-Republican Party members of the United States House of Representatives from New York (state)
People from Plandome, New York
American expatriates in Great Britain